New Point Comfort Light is a lighthouse in the Virginia portion of the Chesapeake Bay, United States, off the tip of the Middle Peninsula. Finished in 1804, it is the third-oldest surviving light in the bay, and the tenth-oldest in the United States.

History

New Point Comfort was one of four locations in the Chesapeake Bay designated for a lighthouse by the newly formed federal government, and in 1801 funds were appropriated for its construction along with a light at Smith Point. Both were constructed by Elzy Burroughs, who also constructed the light at Old Point Comfort which is nearly the twin of this light. (Note that Old Point Comfort and New Point Comfort are two different locations, not two different lights on the same spot.) Burroughs's involvement with New Point Comfort, however, extended beyond construction. New Point Comfort at the time was a small island separated from the mainline by a narrow passage named Deep Creek. A dispute with the owner of the island over the portion needed for the light led first to an additional appropriation; but then Burroughs bought the entire island and sold the government the few acres needed for the light. His decision to subcontract out the construction of the keeper's house proved unwise, and the subcontractor took sick and was unable to supervise the firing of the bricks for the house, which were thus ruined. In the end, Burroughs was appointed keeper himself, a position he held for ten years.

In the War of 1812 British forces destroyed the lantern of the light and the keeper's house. Burroughs he was called upon to rebuild the house. It was he who also took the first steps against the erosion which already threatened the light, by putting a pile- and debris-lined ditch around the tower. The light was extinguished again in the Civil War, but the damage at that time was relatively light. By this time a fourth-order Fresnel lens had been installed. The light was upgraded to acetylene in 1919 and was fully automated in 1930; in the intervening years the keeper's house was demolished and the light maintained with occasional visits only.

Erosion was a constant problem. In 1839 it was already necessary to use a boat to reach the light. The Chesapeake-Potomac Hurricane of 1933 finally cut through the island and left the tower standing on a tiny parcel isolated from the rest of the island. At the same time shoaling to the south of the light rendered it useless as a marker, and it was replaced by an offshore beacon in 1963 and deactivated.

New Point Comfort Light was an early beneficiary of conservation efforts, being transferred to Mathews County in 1975, three years after being listed in the National Register of Historic Places. The lighthouse was renovated in 1989 and reactivated in 1999. In 2001 a task force was formed by the county to oversee the preservation of the lighthouse. In 2012, a grant funded the construction of an enlarged rock barrier to protect the structure, and in 2016, another grant was used to replace the storm-damaged access pier. The tower still stands, surrounded by water, visible from a walkway constructed at the southern tip of the county. Following a lengthy restoration, the lighthouse was relit in October 2021.

Notes

References

Inventory of Historic Light Stations - Virginia Lighthouses: New Point Comfort Light from National Park Service
Chart 12238: Chesapeake Bay Mobjack Bay and York River Entrance NOAA Nautical Chart
New Point Comfort Lighthouse, Virginia from LighthouseFriends.com

External links
New Point Comfort Lighthouse Lighthouse History
New Point Comfort Lighthouse Preservation Task Force Save the Light!
Chesapeake Bay Lighthouse Project - New Point Comfort Light

Lighthouses completed in 1804
Towers completed in 1804
National Register of Historic Places in Mathews County, Virginia
Buildings and structures in Mathews County, Virginia
Lighthouses on the National Register of Historic Places in Virginia
Tourist attractions in Mathews County, Virginia